The Camí de Ronda was a footpath built along the Costa Brava coast to help the Carabineros, and subsequently the Guardia Civil, control the coast and stop smuggling.

The origins are located in the 19th century when it was formed from small footpaths through the cliffs along the coast of Catalonia.  In the 20th Century, especially in the postwar period, the path acquired a great importance as  a method of controlling the country's border, especially in the difficult economic conditions Spain found itself after the civil war.

However corruption ensured the route did not stop smuggling.  The continuing border controls and economic situation in the 1940s and 1950s, when even basic foods, tools and other products were in short supply in Spain, allowed the few smugglers to amass fortunes.  The improvement of the Spanish economy and eventual entry into the European Union ensured the path lost its importance.

Much of the route is now a series of public footpaths often connecting tourist beaches and resorts, and some of these are used as part of the GR 92 long distance footpath that runs the length of the Mediterranean coast of Spain.

References

Bibliography
 Punseti,Daniel; Rovira,Iban; Camí de Ronda, La Travessa a peu de la Costa Brava, Ruta lineal, Triptek Books-Camí de Ronda® (2014, 2015 & 2016 last edition), Map E/1:25.000 Guide in English,Catalan,Español,French, German ISBN  - www.camideronda.com

Geography of Catalonia